Rooms to Let (German: Ruhiges Heim mit Küchenbenutzung) is a 1930 German silent comedy film directed by Carl Wilhelm and starring Lucie Englisch, Elisabeth Pinajeff and Kurt Vespermann. The film's art direction was by Max Heilbronner and Erich Zander. Its fully translated title is Rooms to Let in a Quiet Home, with Use of a Kitchen. A domestic comedy, it was a late silent film just as the transition to sound was taking place.

Cast
 Lucie Englisch as Lotte
 Elisabeth Pinajeff as Bella Donna 
 Kurt Vespermann as Dr. Hans Weber
 Ida Wüst as Gattin
 Luise Bonn as Lola 
 Henry Bender as Theodor Kannebach
 Johanna Ewald as Frau Piefke 
 Heinrich Gotho as Herr Piefke 
 Ellinor Gynt as Amalie Wasserstoff 
 Ida Perry as Frau Amberg 
 Fritz Schulz as Fritz Blitz 
 Emmy Wyda as Fräulein Schmitz

References

Bibliography
Prawer, S.S. Between Two Worlds: The Jewish Presence in German and Austrian Film, 1910–1933. Berghahn Books, 2005.

External links

1930 films
Films of the Weimar Republic
1930 drama films
German silent feature films
German drama films
Films directed by Carl Wilhelm
Films scored by Paul Dessau
German black-and-white films
Silent drama films
1930s German films